The Calvert Peninsula is part of the Western Shore region of the U.S. state of Maryland. It extends about  into Chesapeake Bay with the main bay providing its eastern border and the Patuxent River defining its western border.

Immediately south of the Calvert Peninsula is the larger St. Mary's Peninsula, defined by the Patuxent and Potomac Rivers.

It is the site of Calvert Cliffs State Park and the Calvert Cliffs Nuclear Power Plant.

See also
Delmarva Peninsula

Landforms of Calvert County, Maryland
Peninsulas of Maryland